Southern Greece is a loosely defined geographical term, usually encompassing the Peloponnese peninsula and varying parts of Continental Greece (Attica is usually included), as well as the islands of the Cyclades, the Dodecanese, and Crete. It has never corresponded to a specific administrative or other entity, but is usually defined in juxtaposition with Northern Greece.

See also
 Northern Greece
 Central Greece

References

Administrative regions of Greece
Geography of Greece